Canin is a surname. Notable people with the surname include:

Ethan Canin (born 1960), American author, educator, and physician
Martin Canin (1930–2019), American pianist
Stuart Canin (born 1926), American violinist and conductor

See also
Cann (surname)
Canini